The House Without Windows & Eepersip's Life There is a 1927 novel by Barbara Newhall Follett. With the guidance and support of Follet's father, critic and editor Wilson Follett, it was  published by Alfred A. Knopf in 1927 when Follett was just 12. The novel was reviewed favorably by the New York Times, the Saturday Review, and H. L. Mencken.

References

Further reading
Follett, Barbara Newhall. (1927). The House Without Windows & Eepersip's Life There. New York, London: Knopf.  (Reprinted 1968, New York: Avon Camelot.)

1927 American novels
American fantasy novels